Chinese religion may refer to:
Religion in China  (People's Republic of China)
Religion in Taiwan (Republic of China)
Chinese folk religion
East Asian religions

See also
 Shenism in Southeast Asia